Ourococcus is a genus of green algae, in the family Coccomyxaceae. , although AlgaeBase states that the genus is "accepted taxonomically", the type species Ourococcus bicaudatus is said to be a synonym of Keratococcus bicaudatus, and no species of the genus are listed as accepted.

References

External links

Scientific references

Scientific databases
 AlgaTerra database
 Index Nominum Genericorum

Trebouxiophyceae genera
Trebouxiophyceae